Bharatanatyam is an Indian classical dance form that originated in Tamil Nadu. It is one of eight Indian classical dance forms recognized by the Sangeet Natak Akademi, and expresses South Indian religious themes and spiritual ideas, particularly of Shaivism and in general of Hinduism.

A description of precursors of Bharatanatyam from the 2nd century CE can be found in the ancient Tamil epic Silappatikaram, while temple sculptures of the 6th to 9th century CE suggest dance was a refined performance art by the mid-1st millennium CE. Sadiraattam, which was renamed Bharatanatyam in 1932, is the oldest classical dance tradition in India. Bharatanatyam is the state dance form of Tamil Nadu.

Bharatanatyam contains different types of banis. Bani, or "tradition", is a term used to describe the dance technique and style specific to a guru or school, often named for the village of the guru. Bharatanatyam style is noted for its fixed upper torso, bent legs and knees flexed (Araimandi) combined with footwork, and a vocabulary of sign language based on gestures of hands, eyes, and face muscles. The dance is accompanied by music and a singer, and typically the dancer's guru is present as the nattuvanar or director-conductor of the performance and art. The performance repertoire of Bharatanatyam, like other classical dances, includes nrita (pure dance), nritya (solo expressive dance) and natya (group dramatic dance).

Sadiraattam remained exclusive to Hindu temples through the 19th century. It was banned by the colonial British government in 1910, but the Indian community protested against the ban and expanded its performance outside temples in the 20th century as Bharatanatyam. Modern stage productions of Bharatanatyam have become popular throughout India and include performances that are purely dance-based on non-religious ideas and fusion themes. The Thanjavur Quartet developed the basic structure of modern Bharatanatyam by formalizing it.

Etymology
In 1932, E Krishna Iyer and Rukmini Devi Arundale put forward a proposal to rename Sadiraattam , also known as Parathaiyar Aattam or Thevarattam, as Bharatanatyam, to give the dance form a measure of respect, at a meeting of the Madras Music Academy. They also were instrumental in modifying mainly the Pandanallur style of dance. The word Bharatam is also seen as a backronym, with bha standing for bhavam (feelings, emotions), ra for ragam (melody, framework for musical notes), and tam for talam (rhythm). The term Natyam is a Sanskrit word for "dance". The compound word Bharatanatyam is seen to connote a dance that harmoniously expresses bhavam, ragam and talam.

History

The theoretical foundations of Bharatanatyam are found first in Kootha Nool in Tamil and then referred also in Natya Shastra, a Sanskrit text of performance arts.

Natya Shastra is attributed to the ancient scholar Bharata Muni, and its first complete compilation is dated to between 200 BCE and 200 CE, but estimates vary between 500 BCE and 500 CE. The most studied version of the Natya Shastra text consists of about 6000 verses structured into 36 chapters. The text, states Natalia Lidova, describes the theory of Tāṇḍava dance (Shiva), the theory of rasa, of bhāva, expression, gestures, acting techniques, basic steps, standing postures—all of which are part of Indian classical dances. Dance and performance arts, states this text, are a form of expression of spiritual ideas, virtues and the essence of scriptures.

Historical references to dance are found in the Tamil epics Silappatikaram (c. 2nd century CE) and Manimegalai (c. 6th century). The ancient text Silappatikaram, includes a story of a dancing girl named Madhavi; it describes the dance training regimen called Arangatrau Kathai of Madhavi in verses 113 through 159. The carvings in Kanchipuram's Shiva temple that have been dated to 6th to 9th century CE suggest dance was a well developed performance art by about the mid 1st millennium CE.

A famous example of illustrative sculpture is in the southern gateway of the Chidambaram temple (≈12th century) dedicated to the Hindu god Shiva, where 108 poses, described as karanas in the Natya Shastra, are carved in stone.

Bharatanatyam shares the dance poses of many ancient Shiva sculptures in Hindu temples. The Cave 1 of the Badami cave temples, dated to the 7th century, portrays the Tandava-dancing Shiva as Nataraja. The arms of Shiva express mudras (symbolic hand gestures), that are used in Bharatanatyam.

Devadasis, anti-dance movement, colonial ban and the decline

Some colonial Indologists and modern authors have argued that Bharatanatyam is a descendant of an ancient Devadasi (literally, servant girls of Devas) culture, suggesting a historical origin back to between 300 BCE and 300 CE. Modern scholars has questioned this theory for lack of any direct textual or archeological evidence. Historic sculpture and texts do describe and project dancing girls, as well as temple quarters dedicated to women, but they do not state them to be courtesans and prostitutes as alleged by early colonial Indologists. According to Davesh Soneji, a critical examination of evidence suggests that courtesan dancing is a phenomenon of the modern era, beginning in the late 16th or the 17th century of the Nayaka period of Tamil Nadu. According to James Lochtefeld, classical dance remained exclusive to Hindu temples through the 19th century, only in the 20th century appearing on stage outside the temples. Further, the Thanjavur Maratha kingdom patronized classical dance.

With the arrival of the East India Company in the 18th century, and British colonial rule in the 19th, classical Indian dance forms were ridiculed and discouraged, and these performance arts declined. Christian missionaries and British officials presented "nautch girls" of north India (Kathak) and "devadasis" of south India (Bharatanatyam) as evidence of "harlots, debased erotic culture, slavery to idols and priests" tradition, and Christian missionaries demanded that this must be stopped, launching the "anti-dance movement" in 1892. The anti-dance camp accused the dance form as a front for prostitution, while revivalists questioned the constructed colonial histories.

In 1910, the Madras Presidency of the British Empire banned temple dancing, and with it the classical dance tradition in Hindu temples.

Post-colonial revival

The 1910 ban triggered protests against the stereotyping and dehumanization of temple dancers. Tamil people were concerned that a historic and rich dance tradition was being victimized under the excuse of social reform. Classical art revivalists such as E. Krishna Iyer, a lawyer who had learnt from traditional practitioners of Sadir, questioned the cultural discrimination and the assumed connection, asking why prostitution needs years of learning and training for performance arts, and how killing performance arts could end any evils in a society. Iyer was arrested and sentenced to prison on charges of nationalism, who while serving out his prison term persuaded his fellow political prisoners to support Bharatanatyam.

While the British colonial government enforced laws to suppress Hindu temple dances, some from the West, such as the American dancer Esther Sherman moved to India in 1930, learnt Indian classical dances, changed her name to Ragini Devi, and joined the movement to revive Bharatanatyam and other ancient dance arts.

The Indian independence movement in early 20th century, already in progress, became a period of cultural foment and initiated an effort by its people to reclaim their culture and rediscover history. In this period of cultural and political turmoil, Bharatanatyam was revived as a mainstream dance outside of Hindu temples by artists such as Rukmini Devi Arundale, Balasaraswati and Yamini Krishnamurti They championed and performed the Pandanallur style and Thanjavur styles of Bharatanatyam.

In late 20th century, Tamil Hindu migrants reintroduced the traditions of temple dancing in British Tamil temples.

Repertoire

Bharatanatyam is traditionally a team performance art that consists of a solo dancer, accompanied by musicians and one or more singers. It is described as classical art because the theory of musical notes, vocal performance and the dance movement reflect ideas of the Sanskrit treatise Natya Shastra and other Sanskrit and Tamil texts, such as the Abhinaya Darpana.

The solo artist (ekaharya) in Bharatanatyam is dressed in a colorful sari, adorned with jewelry and presents a dance synchronized with Indian classical music. The hand and facial gestures are a coded sign language able to recite legends and spiritual ideas from the Mahabharata, the Ramayana, the Puranas and historic drama texts. The dancer deploys turns or specific body movements to mark punctuations in the story or the entry of a different character in the play or legend being acted out through dance. Abhinaya is the art of expression in Indian aesthetics; footwork, body language, postures, musical notes, the tones of the vocalist, aesthetics and costumes integrate to express and communicate the underlying text.

In modern adaptations, Bharatanatyam dance troupes may involve many dancers who play specific characters in a story, creatively choreographed to ease the interpretation and expand the experience by the audience.

The repertoire of Bharatanatyam, like all major classical Indian dance forms, follows the three categories of performance in the Natya Shastra. These are Nritta (Nirutham), Nritya (Niruthiyam) and Natya (Natyam).

The Nritta performance is abstract, fast and rhythmic aspect of the dance. The viewer is presented with pure movement in Bharatanatyam, wherein the emphasis is the beauty in motion, form, speed, range and pattern. This part of the repertoire has no interpretative aspect, no telling of story. It is a technical performance, and aims to engage the senses (prakriti) of the audience.
The Nritya is slower and expressive aspect of the dance that attempts to communicate feelings, storyline particularly with spiritual themes in Hindu dance traditions. In a nritya, the dance-acting expands to include silent expression of words through gestures and body motion set to musical notes. The actor articulates a legend or a spiritual message. This part of a Bharatanatyam repertoire is more than sensory enjoyment, it aims to engage the emotions and mind of the viewer.
The Natyam is a play, typically a team performance, but can be acted out by a solo performer where the dancer uses certain standardized body movements to indicate a new character in the underlying story. A Natya incorporates the elements of a Nritya.

Arangetram 
A Bharatanatyam arangetram is a solo debut performance that signifies the completion of initial formal training of a young dancer in Indian classical dance. The term Arangetram translates to "ascending the stage". This performance is typically done ten to twelve years after a dancer begins learning Bharatanatyam, but more importantly, it is done when the guru believes the student is ready for a solo performance. This solo debut is synonymous to a "coming-of-age" celebration. The arangetram is a culmination of multiple years of hard work by the student and the guru, and it is an opportunity for the dancer to showcase his or her dedication and skills developed over the years. Throughout this debut, the dancer performs a series of dances. The dancer must build up his or her concentration and stamina to perform solo dances for approximately three hours. Each dance performed symbolizes various aspects of Hindu religion.

Sequence of dances 

A traditional Bharatanatyam arangetram performance follows a seven to eight-part order of presentation. This set is called margam.

Pushpanjali

The Arangetram performance typically begins with a dance called the Pushpanjali, which literally translates to "offering of flowers". In this dance, the performer offers flowers and salutations to the Hindu deities, the guru, and the audience as a mark of respect. The beginning of the dance symbolizes supplication, from which the dancer then commences the rest of the performance.

Alarippu

The presentation can also begin with a rhythmic invocation (vandana) called the Alarippu. It is a pure dance, which combines a thank you and benediction for blessings from the gods and goddesses, the guru and the gathered performance team. It also serves as a preliminary warm up dance, without melody, to enable the dancer to loosen their body, journey away from distractions and towards single-minded focus.

Jatiswaram

The next stage of the performance adds melody to the movement of Alarippu, and this is called Jatiswaram. The dance remains a prelim technical performance (nritta), pure in form and without any expressed words. The drums set the beat, of any Carnatic music raga (melody). They perform a sequence (Korvai) to the rhythm of the beat, presenting to the audience the unity of music, rhythm and movements.

Shabdam

The performance sequence then adds Shabdam (expressed words). This is the first item of margam where expressions are introduced. The solo dancer, the vocalist(s) and the musical team, in this stage of the production, present short compositions, with words and meaning, in a spectrum of moods. This performance praises God (such as Krishna, Shiva, Rama and Murugan) and their qualities.

Varnam

The performance thereafter evolves into the Varnam stage. This marks the arrival into the sanctum sanctorum core of the performance. It is the longest section and the nritya. A traditional Varnam may be as long as 30–45 minutes or sometimes an hour. Varnam offer huge scope for improvisation and an experienced dancer can stretch the Varnam to a desirable length. The artist presents the play or the main composition, reveling in all their movements, silently communicating the text through codified gestures and footwork, harmoniously with the music, rhythmically punctuated. The dancer performs complicated moves, such as expressing a verse at two speeds. Their hands and body tell a story, whether of love and longing, or of a battle between the good and the evil, as the musicians envelop them with musical notes and tones that set the appropriate mood.

Padam

The Padam is next. This is the stage of reverence, of simplicity, of abhinaya (expression) of the solemn spiritual message or devotional religious prayer (bhakti). The music is lighter, the chant intimate, the dance emotional. The choreography attempts to express rasa (emotional taste) and a mood, while the recital may include items such as a keertanam (expressing devotion), a javali (expressing divine love) or something else.

Tillana

The performance sequence ends with a Tillana, the climax. It closes out the nritya portion, the movements exit the temple of expressive dance, returning to the nritta style, where a series of pure movement and music are rhythmically performed. Therewith the performance ends.

Shlokam or Mangalam

The seventh and final item in the sequence can be either a Shlokam or a Mangalam. The dancer calls for blessings on the people all around.

The overall sequence of Bharatanatyam, states Balasaraswati, thus moves from "mere meter; then melody and meter; continuing with music, meaning and meter; its expansion in the centerpiece of the varnam; thereafter, music and meaning without meter; (...) a non-metrical song at the end. We see a most wonderful completeness and symmetry in this art".

Costume and attire

The costume of a female Bharatanatyam dancer resembles a Tamil Hindu bridal dress. It typically consists of a sari in bright colors with golden or silver zari embroidery on the borders. The costume can be stitched from the sari, with individual pieces for a bottom (either a skirt or salwar-shaped pants), a pleated piece which falls in front and opens like a hand fan when the dancer flexes her knees or performs footwork, a hip piece that covers the seat of the pant / skirt, and a torso piece that looks like an aanchal (i.e. the draped part of a regular sari). Some dancers also opt for an unstitched sari that is draped in a special way, with the single piece of cloth starting around the legs like a dhoti, then upwards along the front torso, over the left shoulder, and then down the back with its end held at the waist by a jewelled belt. The costume of a male Bharatanatyam dancer is usually either a sari or a white cotton cloth draped around the legs and bottom half of the body like a dhoti. During performances, the upper body of the male dancer remains bare. Male dancers typically do not wear stitched costumes.

Both female and male dancers wear elaborate jewellery on their ears, nose, neck, and wrists. Female dancers wear additional jewellery on their head that emphasises their hairline and parting. They also wear a smaller piece of jewellery on each side of their parting. These represent the sun and the moon.

Long hair on both male and female dancers are either secured by a bun or a braid. Female dancers with short hair often use braid extensions or bun hair pieces to simulate long hair. Female dancers also wear imitation flowers made of either cloth or paper around their braids or buns. These are known as (veni or gajra).

Both male and female dancers use wear makeup, including foundation, blush, lipstick, and thick eyeliner or kohl, which help the audience see and understand their facial expressions.

All dancers wear leather anklets on each feet, which are called salangai or ghungroos. These are made of small bells attached to a broad leather strap with belts that secure them at the back of the ankle. The bells are arranged in uniform rows and can be heard when the dancer moves their feet. The salangai helps emphasise the rhythm of the music as well as the dancer's footwork.

Lastly, all dancers outline their hands and feet with red kumkum powder or alta, a tradition that helps the audience easily see their hand and foot gestures.

For classes, training, practice, or rehearsals, dancers traditionally wear a special dance sari. These saris are always cotton and have a shorter breadth than normal saris, falling at the knees rather than the ankles. These are paired with cotton pyjamas and blouses. The sari is worn with pleats at the front and tied tightly around the torso and hips. However, in recent times, dancers also opt for salwar kameez or athletic wear (like T-shirts and leggings) when not performing.

The accompanying music to Bharatanatyam is in the Carnatic style of South India, as is the recitation and chanting. The vocalist is called nattuvanar, typically also the conductor of the entire performance, who may be the guru of the dancer and may also be playing cymbals or one of the musical instruments. The recited verses and text in Bharatanatyam are in Tamil, Telugu, Kannada and Sanskrit.

The instruments used include the mridangam (double-sided drum), nadaswaram (long type of oboe made from a black wood), nattuvangam (cymbals), the flute, violin and veena.

Symbolism

Bharatanatyam, like all classical dances of India, uses symbolism in its abhinaya (acting) and its goals. The roots of abhinaya appear in the Natya Shastra text, which defines drama in verse 6.10 as something that aesthetically arouses joy in the spectator, through the medium of actor's art of communication, that helps connect and transport the individual into a sensual inner state of being. A performance art, asserts Natya Shastra, connects the artists and the audience through abhinaya (literally, "carrying to the spectators"), that is applying body-speech-mind and scene, wherein the actors communicate to the audience, through song and music. Drama in this ancient Sanskrit text, thus is an art that engages every aspect of life to glorify and give a state of joyful consciousness.

The communication through symbols is in the form of expressive gestures and pantomime set to music. The gestures and facial expressions convey the ras (sentiment, emotional taste) and bhava (mood) of the underlying story. In the Hindu texts on dance, the dancer successfully expresses the spiritual ideas by paying attention to four aspects of a performance: Angika (gestures and body language), Vachika (song, recitation, music and rhythm), Aharya (stage setting, costume, make up, jewelry), and Sattvika (artist's mental disposition and emotional connection with the story and audience, wherein the artist's inner and outer state resonates). Abhinaya draws out the bhava (mood, psychological states).

The gestures used in Bharatanatyam are called Hasta (or mudras). These symbols are of three types: asamyuta hastas (single hand gestures), samyuta hastas (two hand gestures) and nrtta hastas (dance hand gestures). Like words in a glossary, these gestures are presented in the nritta as a list or embellishment to a prelim performance. In nritya stage of Bharatanatyam, these symbols set in a certain sequence become sentences with meaning, with emotions expressed through facial expressions and other aspects of abhinaya. The basic standing position is called as Araimandi.

Bharatanatyam contains at least 20 asanas found in modern yoga, including Dhanurasana (the bow, a back-arch); Chakrasana (the wheel, a standing back-arch); Vrikshasana (the tree, a standing pose); and Natarajasana, the pose of dancing Shiva. 108 karanas of classical temple dance are represented in temple statuary; they depict the devadasi temple dancers who made use of yoga asanas in their dancing. Bharatanatyam is also considered a form of Bhakti Yoga. However, Natarajasana is not found in any medieval hatha yoga text; it was among the many asanas introduced into modern yoga by Krishnamacharya in the early 20th century.

Modern revival: schools and training centers

Bharatanatyam rapidly expanded after India gained independence from British rule in 1947. It is now the most popular classical Indian dance style in India, enjoys a high degree of support in expatriate Indian communities, and is considered to be synonymous with Indian dance by many foreigners unaware of the diversity of dances and performance arts in Indian culture. In the second half of the 20th century, Bharatanatyam has been to Indian dance tradition what ballet has been in the West.

When the British government tried to attempt to ban Bharatanatyam traditions, it went on and revived by moving outside the Hindu temple and religious ideas. However, post-independence, with rising interest in its history, the ancient traditions, the invocation rituals and the spiritual expressive part of the dance has returned. Many innovations and developments in modern Bharatanatyam, states Anne-Marie Geston, are of a quasi-religious type. Major cities in India now have numerous schools that offer lessons in Bharatanatyam, and these cities host hundreds of shows every year.

Outside India, Bharatanatyam is a sought after and studied dance, states Meduri, in academic institutes in the United States, Europe, Canada, Australia, Gulf States, Sri Lanka, Malaysia, New Zealand, Bangladesh and Singapore. For expat Indian and Tamil communities in many countries, it is a source and means for social life and community bonding. Contemporary Bharatanatyam choreographies include both male and female dancers.

In 2020, an estimated 10,000 dancers got together in Chennai, India, to break the world record for the largest Bharatanatyam performance. The previous record of 7,190 dancers was set in Chidambaram in 2019.

Gallery

In cinema

 Senthamarai (Tamil, 1962)
 Thillana Mohanambal (Tamil, 1968)
 Paattum Bharathamum (Tamil, 1975)
 Sagara Sangamam (Telugu, 1983)
 Mayuri (Telugu, 1985)
 Manichitrathazhu (Malayalam, 1993)
 Sringaram (Tamil, 2007)
 Kamaladalam (Malayalam, 1992)
Kochu Kochu Santhoshangal (Malayalam)

See also 

 Culture of India
 Vazhuvoor (dance)

Notes

References

Bibliography

Uttara Asha Coorlawala, ed. Re-presenting Indian Dance. Dance Research Journal. Congress on Research in Dance 36/2. Winter 2004. ISSN 0149-7677

Douglas M. Knight, Jr. Balasaraswati: Her Art and Life. Wesleyan University Press. Middletown, CT, 2010. 
Sunil Kothari, Bharata Natyam, Marg Publications, Mumbai: 1997.

Narayanan Chittoor Namboodiripad, "Revealing the Art of Natyasastra." 
Srividya Natarajan Another Stage in the Life of the Nation: Sadir, Bharatanatyam, Feminist Theory. Unpublished Ph.D. Thesis, Dept of English, University of Hyderabad, 1997.

Sukanya Rahman. Dancing in the Family. Rupa and Co. New Delhi: 2004. 
Vijaya Rao, (1987), Abbild des Göttlichen. Bharata Natyam. Der klassische Indische Tanz. Freiburg (Germany)

, Table of Contents

External links

 
Tamil culture
Hindu traditions
South India
Indian culture
Classical dance genres of India
Articles containing video clips
Hindu art